In historical contexts, New Imperialism characterizes a period of colonial expansion by European powers, the United States, and Japan during the late 19th and early 20th centuries.
The period featured an unprecedented pursuit of overseas territorial acquisitions. At the time, states focused on building their empires with new technological advances and developments, expanding their territory through conquest, and exploiting the resources of the subjugated countries.
During the era of New Imperialism, the Western powers (and Japan) individually conquered almost all of Africa and parts of Asia. The new wave of imperialism reflected ongoing rivalries among the great powers, the economic desire for new resources and markets, and a "civilizing mission" ethos. Many of the colonies established during this era gained independence during the era of decolonization that followed World War II.

The qualifier "new" is used to differentiate modern imperialism from earlier imperial activity, such as the formation of ancient empires and the first wave of European colonization.

Rise 

The American Revolutionary War (1775–83) and the collapse of the Spanish Empire in Latin America in the 1820s ended the first era of European imperialism. Especially in Great Britain these revolutions helped show the deficiencies of mercantilism, the doctrine of economic competition for finite wealth which had supported earlier imperial expansion. In 1846, the Corn Laws were repealed and manufacturers grew, as the regulations enforced by the Corn Laws had slowed their businesses. With the repeal in place, the manufacturers were able to trade more freely. Thus, Britain began to adopt the concept of free trade.

During this period, between the 1815 Congress of Vienna after the defeat of Napoleonic France and Imperial Germany's victory in the Franco-Prussian War in 1871, Great Britain reaped the benefits of being Europe's dominant military and economic power. As the "workshop of the world", Britain could produce finished goods so efficiently that they could usually undersell comparable, locally manufactured goods in foreign markets, supplying a large share of the manufactured goods consumed by such nations as the German states, France, Belgium, and the United States. 

The erosion of British hegemony after the Franco-Prussian War, in which a coalition of German states led by Prussia soundly defeated the Second French Empire, was occasioned by changes in the European and world economies and in the continental balance of power following the breakdown of the Concert of Europe, established by the Congress of Vienna. The establishment of nation-states in Germany and Italy resolved territorial issues that had kept potential rivals embroiled in internal affairs at the heart of Europe to Britain's advantage. The years from 1871 to 1914 would be marked by an extremely unstable peace. France's determination to recover Alsace-Lorraine, annexed by Germany as a result of the Franco-Prussian War, and Germany's mounting imperialist ambitions would keep the two nations constantly poised for conflict.

This competition was sharpened by the Long Depression of 1873–1896, a prolonged period of price deflation punctuated by severe business downturns, which put pressure on governments to promote home industry, leading to the widespread abandonment of free trade among Europe's powers (in Germany from 1879 and in France from 1881).

Berlin Conference 

The Berlin Conference of 1884–1885 sought to destroy the competition between the powers by defining "effective occupation" as the criterion for international recognition of a territory claim, specifically in Africa. The imposition of direct rule in terms of "effective occupation" necessitated routine recourse to armed force against indigenous states and peoples. Uprisings against imperial rule were put down ruthlessly, most brutally in the Herero Wars in German South-West Africa from 1904 to 1907 and the Maji Maji Rebellion in German East Africa from 1905 to 1907. One of the goals of the conference was to reach agreements over trade, navigation, and boundaries of Central Africa. However, of all of the 15 nations in attendance of the Berlin Conference, none of the countries represented were African.

The main dominating powers of the conference were France, Germany, Great Britain and Portugal. They remapped Africa without considering the cultural and linguistic borders that were already established. At the end of the conference, Africa was divided into 50 different colonies. The attendants established who was in control of each of these newly divided colonies. They also planned, noncommittally, to end the slave trade in Africa.

Britain during the era

In Britain, the age of new imperialism marked a time for significant economic changes. Because the country was the first to industrialize, Britain was technologically ahead of many other countries throughout the majority of the nineteenth century. By the end of the nineteenth century, however, other countries, chiefly Germany and the United States, began to challenge Britain's technological and economic power. After several decades of monopoly, the country was battling to maintain a dominant economic position while other powers became more involved in international markets. In 1870, Britain contained 31.8% of the world's manufacturing capacity while the United States contained 23.3% and Germany contained 13.2%. By 1910, Britain's manufacturing capacity had dropped to 14.7%, while that of the United States had risen to 35.3% and that of Germany to 15.9%. As countries like Germany and America became more economically successful, they began to become more involved with imperialism, resulting in the British struggling to maintain the volume of British trade and investment overseas.

Britain further faced strained international relations with three expansionist powers (Japan, Germany, and Italy) during the early twentieth century. Before 1939, these three powers never directly threatened Britain itself, but the dangers to the Empire were clear. By the 1930s, Britain was worried that Japan would threaten its holdings in the Far East as well as territories in India, Australia and New Zealand. Italy held an interest in North Africa, which threatened British Egypt, and German dominance of the European continent held some danger for Britain's security. Britain worried that the expansionist powers would cause the breakdown of international stability; as such, British foreign policy attempted to protect the stability in a rapidly changing world. With its stability and holdings threatened, Britain decided to adopt a policy of concession rather than resistance, a policy that became known as appeasement.

In Britain, the era of new imperialism affected public attitudes toward the idea of imperialism itself. Most of the public believed that if imperialism was going to exist, it was best if Britain was the driving force behind it. The same people further thought that British imperialism was a force for good in the world. In 1940, the Fabian Colonial Research Bureau argued that Africa could be developed both economically and socially, but until this development could happen, Africa was best off remaining with the British Empire. Rudyard Kipling's 1891 poem, "The English Flag," contains the stanza:
     Winds of the World, give answer! They are whimpering to and fro--
        And what should they know of England who only England know?--
     The poor little street-bred people that vapour and fume and brag,
        They are lifting their heads in the stillness to yelp at the English Flag!

These lines show Kipling's belief that the British who actively took part in imperialism knew more about British national identity than the ones whose entire lives were spent solely in the imperial metropolis. While there were pockets of anti-imperialist opposition in Britain in the late nineteenth and early twentieth centuries, resistance to imperialism was nearly nonexistent in the country as a whole. In many ways, this new form of imperialism formed a part of the British identity until the end of the era of new imperialism with the Second World War.

Social implications 
New Imperialism gave rise to new social views of colonialism. Rudyard Kipling, for instance, urged the United States to "Take up the White Man's burden" of bringing European civilization to the other peoples of the world, regardless of whether these "other peoples" wanted this civilization or not. This part of The White Man's Burden exemplifies Britain's perceived attitude towards the colonization of other countries: 

While Social Darwinism became popular throughout Western Europe and the United States, the paternalistic French and Portuguese "civilizing mission" appealed to many European statesmen both in and outside France. Despite apparent benevolence existing in the notion of the "White Man's Burden", the unintended consequences of imperialism might have greatly outweighed the potential benefits.  Governments became increasingly paternalistic at home and neglected the individual liberties of their citizens. Military spending expanded, usually leading to an "imperial overreach", and imperialism created clients of ruling elites abroad that were brutal and corrupt, consolidating power through imperial rents and impeding social change and economic development that ran against their ambitions. Furthermore, "nation building" oftentimes created cultural sentiments of racism and xenophobia.

Many of Europe's major elites also found advantages in formal, overseas expansion: large financial and industrial monopolies wanted imperial support to protect their overseas investments against competition and domestic political tensions abroad, bureaucrats sought government offices, military officers desired promotion, and the traditional but waning landed gentries sought increased profits for their investments, formal titles, and high office.  Such special interests have perpetuated empire building throughout history.

Observing the rise of trade unionism, socialism, and other protest movements during an era of mass society both in Europe and later in North America, elites sought to use imperial jingoism to co-opt the support of part of the industrial working class. The new mass media promoted jingoism in the Spanish–American War (1898), the Second Boer War (1899–1902), and the Boxer Rebellion (1900). The left-wing German historian Hans-Ulrich Wehler has defined social imperialism as "the diversions outwards of internal tensions and forces of change in order to preserve the social and political status quo", and as a "defensive ideology" to counter the "disruptive effects of industrialization on the social and economic structure of Germany". In Wehler's opinion, social imperialism was a device that allowed the German government to distract public attention from domestic problems and preserve the existing social and political order. The dominant elites used social imperialism as the glue to hold together a fractured society and to maintain popular support for the social status quo. According to Wehler, German colonial policy in the 1880s was the first example of social imperialism in action, and was followed up by the 1897 Tirpitz Plan for expanding the German Navy. In this point of view, groups such as the Colonial Society and the Navy League are seen as instruments for the government to mobilize public support. The demands for annexing most of Europe and Africa in World War I are seen by Wehler as the pinnacle of social imperialism.

The notion of rule over foreign lands commanded widespread acceptance among metropolitan populations, even among those who associated imperial colonization with oppression and exploitation. For example, the 1904 Congress of the Socialist International concluded that the colonial peoples should be taken in hand by future European socialist governments and led by them into eventual independence.

South Asia

India 

In the 17th century, the British businessmen arrived in India and, after taking a small portion of land, formed the East India Company. The British East India Company annexed most of the subcontinent of India, starting with Bengal in 1757 and ending with Punjab in 1849. Many princely states remained independent. This was aided by a power vacuum formed by the collapse of the Mughal Empire in India and the death of Mughal Emperor Aurangzeb and increased British forces in India because of colonial conflicts with France. The invention of clipper ships in the early 1800s cut the trip to India from Europe in half from 6 months to 3 months; the British also laid cables on the floor of the ocean allowing telegrams to be sent from India and China. In 1818, the British controlled most of the Indian subcontinent and began imposing their ideas and ways on its residents, including different succession laws that allowed the British to take over a state with no successor and gain its land and armies, new taxes, and monopolistic control of industry. The British also collaborated with Indian officials to increase their influence in the region.

Some Hindu and Muslim sepoys rebelled in 1857, resulting in the Indian Rebellion. After this revolt was suppressed by the British, India came under the direct control of the British crown. After the British had gained more control over India, they began changing around the financial state of India. Previously, Europe had to pay for Indian textiles and spices in bullion; with political control, Britain directed farmers to grow cash crops for the company for exports to Europe while India became a market for textiles from Britain. In addition, the British collected huge revenues from land rent and taxes on its acquired monopoly on salt production. Indian weavers were replaced by new spinning and weaving machines and Indian food crops were replaced by cash crops like cotton and tea.

The British also began connecting Indian cities by railroad and telegraph to make travel and communication easier as well as building an irrigation system for increasing agricultural production. When Western education was introduced in India, Indians were quite influenced by it, but the inequalities between the British ideals of governance and their treatment of Indians became clear. In response to this discriminatory treatment, a group of educated Indians established the Indian National Congress, demanding equal treatment and self-governance.

John Robert Seeley, a Cambridge Professor of History, said, "Our acquisition of India was made blindly. Nothing great that has ever been done by Englishmen was done so unintentionally or accidentally as the conquest of India". According to him, the political control of India was not a conquest in the usual sense because it was not an act of a state.

The new administrative arrangement, crowned with Queen Victoria's proclamation as Empress of India in 1876, effectively replaced the rule of a monopolistic enterprise with that of a trained civil service headed by graduates of Britain's top universities. The administration retained and increased the monopolies held by the company. The India Salt Act of 1882 included regulations enforcing a government monopoly on the collection and manufacture of salt; in 1923 a bill was passed doubling the salt tax.

Southeast Asia
After taking control of much of India, the British expanded further into Burma, Malaya, Singapore and Borneo, with these colonies becoming further sources of trade and raw materials for British goods. The United States laid claim to the Philippines, and after the Philippine–American War, took control of the country as one of its overseas possessions.

Indonesia

Formal colonization of the Dutch East Indies (now Indonesia) commenced at the dawn of the 19th century when the Dutch state took possession of all Dutch East India Company (VOC) assets. Before that time the VOC merchants were in principle just another trading power among many, establishing trading posts and settlements (colonies) in strategic places around the archipelago. The Dutch gradually extended their sovereignty over most of the islands in the East Indies. Dutch expansion paused for several years during an interregnum of British rule between 1806 and 1816, when the Dutch Republic was occupied by the French forces of Napoleon. The Dutch government-in-exile in England ceded rule of all its colonies to Great Britain. However, Jan Willem Janssens, the Governor of the Dutch East Indies at the time, fought the British before surrendering the colony; he was eventually replaced by Stamford Raffles.

The Dutch East Indies became the prize possession of the Dutch Empire. It was not the typical settler colony founded through massive emigration from the mother countries (such as the USA or Australia) and hardly involved displacement of the indigenous islanders, with a notable and dramatic exception in the island of Banda during the VOC era. Neither was it a plantation colony built on the import of slaves (such as Haiti or Jamaica) or a pure trade post colony (such as Singapore or Macau). It was more of an expansion of the existing chain of VOC trading posts. Instead of mass emigration from the homeland, the sizeable indigenous populations were controlled through effective political manipulation supported by military force. The servitude of the indigenous masses was enabled through a structure of indirect governance, keeping existing indigenous rulers in place. This strategy was already established by the VOC, which independently acted as a semi-sovereign state within the Dutch state, using the Indo Eurasian population as an intermediary buffer.

In 1869 British anthropologist Alfred Russel Wallace described the colonial governing structure in his book "The Malay Archipelago":

"The mode of government now adopted in Java is to retain the whole series of native rulers, from the village chief up to princes, who, under the name of Regents, are the heads of districts about the size of a small English county. With each Regent is placed a Dutch Resident, or Assistant Resident, who is considered to be his "elder brother," and whose "orders" take the form of "recommendations," which are, however, implicitly obeyed. Along with each Assistant, Resident is a Controller, a kind of inspector of all the lower native rulers, who periodically visits every village in the district, examines the proceedings of the native courts, hears complaints against the head-men or other native chiefs, and superintends the Government plantations."

Indochina
France annexed all of Vietnam and Cambodia in the 1880s; in the following decade, France completed its Indochinese empire with the annexation of Laos, leaving the kingdom of Siam (now Thailand) with an uneasy independence as a neutral buffer between British and French-ruled lands.

East Asia

China 

In 1839, China found itself fighting the First Opium War with Great Britain after the Governor-General of Hunan and Hubei, Lin Zexu, seized the illegally traded opium. China was defeated, and in 1842 agreed to the provisions of the Treaty of Nanking. Hong Kong Island was ceded to Britain, and certain ports, including Shanghai and Guangzhou, were opened to British trade and residence. In 1856, the Second Opium War broke out; the Chinese were again defeated and forced to the terms of the 1858 Treaty of Tientsin and the 1860 Convention of Peking. The treaty opened new ports to trade and allowed foreigners to travel in the interior. Missionaries gained the right to propagate Christianity, another means of Western penetration. The United States and Russia obtained the same prerogatives in separate treaties.

Towards the end of the 19th century, China appeared on the way to territorial dismemberment and economic vassalage, the fate of India's rulers that had played out much earlier. Several provisions of these treaties caused long-standing bitterness and humiliation among the Chinese: extraterritoriality (meaning that in a dispute with a Chinese person, a Westerner had the right to be tried in a court under the laws of his own country), customs regulation, and the right to station foreign warships in Chinese waters.

In 1904, the British invaded Lhasa, a pre-emptive strike against Russian intrigues and secret meetings between the 13th Dalai Lama's envoy and Tsar Nicholas II. The Dalai Lama fled into exile to China and Mongolia. The British were greatly concerned at the prospect of a Russian invasion of the Crown colony of India, though Russia – badly defeated by Japan in the Russo-Japanese War and weakened by internal rebellion – could not realistically afford a military conflict against Britain. China under the Qing dynasty, however, was another matter.

Natural disasters, famine and internal rebellions had enfeebled China in the late Qing. In the late 19th century, Japan and the Great Powers easily carved out trade and territorial concessions. These were humiliating submissions for the once-powerful China. Still, the central lesson of the war with Japan was not lost on the Russian General Staff: an Asian country using Western technology and industrial production methods could defeat a great European power. Jane E. Elliott criticized the allegation that China refused to modernize or was unable to defeat Western armies as simplistic, noting that China embarked on a massive military modernization in the late 1800s after several defeats, buying weapons from Western countries and manufacturing their own at arsenals, such as the Hanyang Arsenal during the Boxer Rebellion. In addition, Elliott questioned the claim that Chinese society was traumatized by the Western victories, as many Chinese peasants (90% of the population at that time) living outside the concessions continued about their daily lives, uninterrupted and without any feeling of "humiliation".

The British observer Demetrius Charles de Kavanagh Boulger suggested a British-Chinese alliance to check Russian expansion in Central Asia.

During the Ili crisis when Qing China threatened to go to war against Russia over the Russian occupation of Ili, the British officer Charles George Gordon was sent to China by Britain to advise China on military options against Russia should a potential war break out between China and Russia.

The Russians observed the Chinese building up their arsenal of modern weapons during the Ili crisis, the Chinese bought thousands of rifles from Germany. In 1880 massive amounts of military equipment and rifles were shipped via boats to China from Antwerp as China purchased torpedoes, artillery, and 260,260 modern rifles from Europe.

The Russian military observer D. V. Putiatia visited China in 1888 and found that in Northeastern China (Manchuria) along the Chinese-Russian border, the Chinese soldiers were potentially able to become adept at "European tactics" under certain circumstances, and the Chinese soldiers were armed with modern weapons like Krupp artillery, Winchester carbines, and Mauser rifles.

Compared to Russian controlled areas, more benefits were given to the Muslim Kirghiz on the Chinese controlled areas. Russian settlers fought against the Muslim nomadic Kirghiz, which led the Russians to believe that the Kirghiz would be a liability in any conflict against China. The Muslim Kirghiz were sure that in an upcoming war, that China would defeat Russia.

The Qing dynasty forced Russia to hand over disputed territory in Ili in the Treaty of Saint Petersburg (1881), in what was widely seen by the west as a diplomatic victory for the Qing. Russia acknowledged that Qing China potentially posed a serious military threat. Mass media in the west during this era portrayed China as a rising military power due to its modernization programs and as major threat to the western world, invoking fears that China would successfully conquer western colonies like Australia.

Russian sinologists, the Russian media, threat of internal rebellion, the pariah status inflicted by the Congress of Berlin, and the negative state of the Russian economy all led Russia to concede and negotiate with China in St Petersburg, and return most of Ili to China.

Historians have judged the Qing dynasty's vulnerability and weakness to foreign imperialism in the 19th century to be based mainly on its maritime naval weakness while it achieved military success against westerners on land, the historian Edward L. Dreyer said that "China’s nineteenth-century humiliations were strongly related to her weakness and failure at sea. At the start of the Opium War, China had no unified navy and no sense of how vulnerable she was to attack from the sea; British forces sailed and steamed wherever they wanted to go. ... In the Arrow War (1856–60), the Chinese had no way to prevent the Anglo-French expedition of 1860 from sailing into the Gulf of Zhili and landing as near as possible to Beijing. Meanwhile, new but not exactly modern Chinese armies suppressed the midcentury rebellions, bluffed Russia into a peaceful settlement of disputed frontiers in Central Asia, and defeated the French forces on land in the Sino-French War (1884–85). But the defeat of the fleet, and the resulting threat to steamship traffic to Taiwan, forced China to conclude peace on unfavorable terms."

The British and Russian consuls schemed and plotted against each other at Kashgar.

In 1906, Tsar Nicholas II sent a secret agent to China to collect intelligence on the reform and modernization of the Qing dynasty. The task was given to Carl Gustaf Emil Mannerheim, at the time a colonel in the Russian army, who travelled to China with French Sinologist Paul Pelliot. Mannerheim was disguised as an ethnographic collector, using a Finnish passport. Finland was, at the time, a Grand Duchy. For two years, Mannerheim proceeded through Xinjiang, Gansu, Shaanxi, Henan, Shanxi and Inner Mongolia to Beijing. At the sacred Buddhist mountain of Wutai Shan he even met the 13th Dalai Lama. However, while Mannerheim was in China in 1907, Russia and Britain brokered the Anglo-Russian Agreement, ending the classical period of the Great Game.

The correspondent Douglas Story observed Chinese troops in 1907 and praised their abilities and military skill.

The rise of Japan as an imperial power after the Meiji Restoration led to further subjugation of China. In a dispute over regional suzerainty, war broke out between China and Japan, resulting in another humiliating defeat for the Chinese. By the Treaty of Shimonoseki in 1895, China was forced to recognize Korea's exit from the Imperial Chinese tributary system, leading to the proclamation of the Korean Empire, and the island of Taiwan was ceded to Japan.

In 1897, taking advantage of the murder of two missionaries, Germany demanded and was given a set of mining and railroad rights around Jiaozhou Bay in Shandong province. In 1898, Russia obtained access to Dairen and Port Arthur and the right to build a railroad across Manchuria, thereby achieving complete domination over a large portion of northeast China. The United Kingdom, France, and Japan also received a number of concessions later that year.

The erosion of Chinese sovereignty contributed to a spectacular anti-foreign outbreak in June 1900, when the "Boxers" (properly the society of the "righteous and harmonious fists") attacked foreign legations in Beijing. This Boxer Rebellion provoked a rare display of unity among the colonial powers, who formed the Eight-Nation Alliance. Troops landed at Tianjin and marched on the capital, which they took on 14 August; the foreign soldiers then looted and occupied Beijing for several months. German forces were particularly severe in exacting revenge for the killing of their ambassador, while Russia tightened its hold on Manchuria in the northeast until its crushing defeat by Japan in the Russo-Japanese War of 1904–1905.

Although extraterritorial jurisdiction was abandoned by the United Kingdom and the United States in 1943, foreign political control of parts of China only finally ended with the incorporation of Hong Kong and the small Portuguese territory of Macau into the People's Republic of China in 1997 and 1999 respectively.

Mainland Chinese historians refer to this period as the century of humiliation.

Central Asia

"The Great Game" (Also called the Tournament of Shadows (Turniry Teney) in Russia) was the strategic, economic and political rivalry, emanating to conflict between the British Empire and the Russian Empire for supremacy in Central Asia at the expense of Afghanistan, Persia and the Central Asian Khanates/Emirates. The classic Great Game period is generally regarded as running approximately from the Russo-Persian Treaty of 1813 to the Anglo-Russian Convention of 1907, in which nations like Emirate of Bukhara fell. A less intensive phase followed the Bolshevik Revolution of 1917, causing some trouble with Persia and Afghanistan until the mid 1920s.

In the post-Second World War post-colonial period, the term has informally continued in its usage to describe the geopolitical machinations of the great powers and regional powers as they vie for geopolitical power as well as influence in the area, especially in Afghanistan and Iran/Persia.

Africa

Prelude

Between 1850 and 1914, Britain brought nearly 30% of Africa's population under its control, to 15% for France, 9% for Germany, 7% for Belgium and 1% for Italy: Nigeria alone contributed 15 million subjects to Britain, more than in the whole of French West Africa, or the entire German colonial empire. The only nations that were not under European control by 1914 were Liberia and Ethiopia.

British colonies

Britain's formal occupation of Egypt in 1882, triggered by concern over the Suez Canal, contributed to a preoccupation over securing control of the Nile River, leading to the conquest of neighboring Sudan in 1896–1898, which in turn led to confrontation with a French military expedition at Fashoda in September 1898. In 1899, Britain set out to complete its takeover of the future South Africa, which it had begun in 1814 with the annexation of the Cape Colony, by invading the gold-rich Afrikaner republics of Transvaal and the neighboring Orange Free State. The chartered British South Africa Company had already seized the land to the north, renamed Rhodesia after its head, the Cape tycoon Cecil Rhodes.

British gains in southern and East Africa prompted Rhodes and Alfred Milner, Britain's High Commissioner in South Africa, to urge a "Cape to Cairo" empire: linked by rail, the strategically important Canal would be firmly connected to the mineral-rich South, though Belgian control of the Congo Free State and German control of German East Africa prevented such an outcome until the end of World War I, when Great Britain acquired the latter territory.

Britain's quest for southern Africa and its diamonds led to social complications and fallouts that lasted for years.  To work for their prosperous company, British businessmen hired both white and black South Africans.  But when it came to jobs, the white South Africans received the higher paid and less dangerous ones, leaving the black South Africans to risk their lives in the mines for limited pay. This process of separating the two groups of South Africans, whites and blacks, was the beginning of segregation between the two that lasted until 1990.

Paradoxically, the United Kingdom, a staunch advocate of free trade, emerged in 1914 with not only the largest overseas empire, thanks to its long-standing presence in India, but also the greatest gains in the conquest of Africa, reflecting its advantageous position at its inception.

Congo Free State 
Until 1876, Belgium had no colonial presence in Africa. It was then that its king, Leopold II created the International African Society. Operating under the pretense of an international scientific and philanthropic association, it was actually a private holding company owned by Leopold. Henry Morton Stanley was employed to explore and colonize the Congo River basin area of equatorial Africa in order to capitalize on the plentiful resources such as ivory, rubber, diamonds, and metals. Up until this point, Africa was known as "the Dark Continent" because of the difficulties Europeans had with exploration.

Neither the Belgian government nor the Belgian people had any interest in imperialism at the time, and the land came to be personally owned by King Leopold II. At the Berlin Conference in 1884, he was allowed to have land named the Congo Free State. The other European countries at the conference allowed this to happen on the conditions that he suppress the East African slave trade, promote humanitarian policies, guarantee free trade, and encourage missions to Christianize the people of the Congo. However, Leopold II's primary focus was to make a large profit on the natural resources, particularly ivory and rubber. In order to make this profit, he passed several cruel decrees that can be considered to be genocide. He forced the natives to supply him with rubber and ivory without any sort of payment in return. Their wives and children were held hostage until the workers returned with enough rubber or ivory to fill their quota, and if they could not, their family would be killed. When villages refused, they were burned down; the children of the village were murdered and the men had their hands cut off. These policies led to uprisings, but they were feeble compared to European military and technological might, and were consequently crushed. The forced labor was opposed in other ways: fleeing into the forests to seek refuge or setting the rubber forests on fire, preventing the Europeans from harvesting the rubber.

No population figures exist from before or after the period, but it is estimated that as many as 10 million people died from violence, famine and disease. However, some sources point to a total population of 16 million people.

King Leopold II profited from the enterprise with a 700% profit ratio for the rubber he took from Congo and exported. He used propaganda to keep the other European nations at bay, for he broke almost all of the parts of the agreement he made at the Berlin Conference. For example, he had some Congolese pygmies sing and dance at the 1897 World Fair in Belgium, showing how he was supposedly civilizing and educating the natives of the Congo. Under significant international pressure, the Belgian government annexed the territory in 1908 and renamed it the Belgian Congo, removing it from the personal power of the king. Of all the colonies that were conquered during the wave of New Imperialism, the human rights abuses of the Congo Free State were considered the worst.

Oceania

France gained a leading position as an imperial power in the Pacific after making Tahiti and New Caledonia protectorates in 1842 and 1853 respectively. Tahiti was later annexed entirely into the French colonial empire in 1880, along with the rest of the Society Islands.

The United States made several territorial gains during this period, particularly with the annexation of Hawaii and acquisition of most of Spain's colonial outposts following the 1898 Spanish–American War, as well as the partition of the Samoan Islands into American Samoa and German Samoa.

By 1900, nearly all islands in the Pacific Ocean were under the control of Britain, France, the United States, Germany, Japan, Mexico, Ecuador, and Chile.

Chilean expansion
Chile's interest in expanding into the islands of the Pacific Ocean dates to the presidency of José Joaquín Prieto (1831-1841) and the ideology of Diego Portales, who considered that Chile's expansion into Polynesia was a natural consequence of its maritime destiny. Nonetheless, the first stage of the country's expansionism into the Pacific began only a decade later, in 1851, when—in response to an American incursion into the Juan Fernández Islands—Chile's government formally organized the islands into a subdelegation of Valparaíso. That same year, Chile's economic interest in the Pacific were renewed after  its merchant fleet briefly succeeded in creating an agricultural goods exchange market that connected the Californian port of San Francisco with Australia. By 1861, Chile had established a lucrative enterprise across the Pacific, its national currency abundantly circulating throughout Polynesia and its merchants trading in the markets of Tahiti, New Zealand, Tasmania, and Shanghai; negotiations were also made with the Spanish Philippines, and altercations reportedly occurred between Chilean and American whalers in the Sea of Japan. This period ended as a result of the Chilean merchant fleet's destruction by Spanish forces in 1866, during the Chincha Islands War.

Chile's Polynesian aspirations would again be awakened in the aftermath of the country's decisive victory against Peru in the War of the Pacific, which left the Chilean fleet as the dominant maritime force in the Pacific coast of the Americas. Valparaíso had also become the most important port in the Pacific coast of South America, providing Chilean merchants with the capacity to find markets in the Pacific for its new mineral wealth acquired from the Atacama. During this period, the Chilean intellectual and politician Benjamín Vicuña Mackenna (who served as senator in the National Congress from 1876 to 1885) was an influential voice in favor of Chilean expansionism into the Pacific—he considered that Spain's discoveries in the Pacific had been stolen by the British, and envisioned that Chile's duty was to create an empire in the Pacific that would reach Asia. In the context of this imperialist fervor is that, in 1886, Captain Policarpo Toro of the Chilean Navy proposed to his superiors the annexation of Easter Island; a proposal which was supported by President José Manuel Balmaceda because of the island's apparent strategic location and economic value. After Toro transferred the rights to the island's sheep ranching operations from Tahiti-based businesses to the Chilean-based Williamson-Balfour Company in 1887, Easter Island's annexation process was culminated with the signing of the "Agreement of Wills" between Rapa Nui chieftains and Toro, in name of the Chilean government, in 1888. By occupying Easter Island, Chile joined the imperial nations.

Imperial rivalries 

The extension of European control over Africa and Asia added a further dimension to the rivalry and mutual suspicion which characterized international diplomacy in the decades preceding World War I. France's seizure of Tunisia in 1881 initiated fifteen years of tension with Italy, which had hoped to take the country, retaliating by allying with Germany and waging a decade-long tariff war with France. Britain's takeover of Egypt a year later caused a marked cooling of its relations with France.

The most striking conflicts of the era were the Spanish–American War of 1898 and the Russo-Japanese War of 1904–05, each signaling the advent of a new imperial great power; the United States and Japan, respectively. The Fashoda incident of 1898 represented the worst Anglo-French crisis in decades, but France's buckling in the face of British demands foreshadowed improved relations as the two countries set about resolving their overseas claims.

British policy in South Africa and German actions in the Far East contributed to dramatic policy shifts, which in the 1900s, aligned hitherto isolationist Britain first with Japan as an ally, and then with France and Russia in the looser Triple Entente. German efforts to break the Entente by challenging French hegemony in Morocco resulted in the Tangier Crisis of 1905 and the Agadir Crisis of 1911, adding to tension and anti-German sentiment in the years preceding World War I. In the Pacific, conflicts between Germany, the United States, and the United Kingdom contributed to the First and Second Samoan Civil War.

Another crisis occurred in 1902–03, when there was a stand-off between Venezuela backed by Argentina, the United States (see Drago Doctrine and Monroe Doctrine) and a coalition of European countries.

Motivation

Humanitarianism 
One of the biggest motivations behind New Imperialism was the idea of humanitarianism and "civilizing" the "lower" class people in Africa and in other undeveloped places. This was a religious motive for many Christian missionaries, in an attempt to save the souls of the "uncivilized" people, and based on the idea that Christians and the people of the United Kingdom were morally superior. Most of the missionaries that supported imperialism did so because they felt the only true religion was their own. Similarly, Roman Catholic missionaries opposed British missionaries because the British missionaries were Protestant. At times, however, imperialism did help the people of the colonies because the missionaries ended up stopping some of the slavery in some areas. Therefore, Europeans claimed that they were only there because they wanted to protect the weaker tribal groups they conquered. The missionaries and other leaders suggested that they should stop such practices as cannibalism, child marriage, and other "savage things". This humanitarian ideal was described in poems such as the White Man's Burden and other literature. Often, the humanitarianism was sincere, but with misguided choices. Although some imperialists were trying to be sincere with the notion of humanitarianism, at times their choices might not have been best for the areas they were conquering and the natives living there.

Dutch Ethical Policy

The Dutch Ethical Policy was the dominant reformist and liberal political character of colonial policy in the Dutch East Indies during the 20th century. In 1901, the Dutch Queen Wilhelmina announced that the Netherlands accepted an ethical responsibility for the welfare of their colonial subjects.  This announcement was a sharp contrast with the former official doctrine that Indonesia was mainly a wingewest (region for making profit). It marked the start of modern development policy, implemented and practised by Alexander Willem Frederik Idenburg, whereas other colonial powers usually talked of a civilizing mission, which mainly involved spreading their culture to colonized peoples.

The Dutch Ethical Policy emphasised improvement in material living conditions.  The policy suffered, however, from serious underfunding, inflated expectations and lack of acceptance in the Dutch colonial establishment, and it had largely ceased to exist by the onset of the Great Depression in 1929. It did however create an educated indigenous elite able to articulate and eventually establish independence from the Netherlands.

Theories 
The "accumulation theory" adopted by Karl Kautsky, John A. Hobson and popularized by Vladimir Lenin centered on the accumulation of surplus capital during and after the Industrial Revolution: restricted opportunities at home, the argument goes, drove financial interests to seek more profitable investments in less-developed lands with lower labor costs, unexploited raw materials and little competition. Hobson's analysis fails to explain colonial expansion on the part of less industrialized nations with little surplus capital, such as Italy, or the great powers of the next century—the United States and Russia—which were in fact net borrowers of foreign capital. Also, military and bureaucratic costs of occupation frequently exceeded financial returns. In Africa (exclusive of what would become the Union of South Africa in 1909) the amount of capital investment by Europeans was relatively small before and after the 1880s, and the companies involved in tropical African commerce exerted limited political influence.

The "World-Systems theory" approach of Immanuel Wallerstein sees imperialism as part of a general, gradual extension of capital investment from the "core" of the industrial countries to a less developed "periphery." Protectionism and formal empire were the major tools of "semi-peripheral," newly industrialized states, such as Germany, seeking to usurp Britain's position at the "core" of the global capitalist system.

Echoing Wallerstein's global perspective to an extent, imperial historian Bernard Porter views Britain's adoption of formal imperialism as a symptom and an effect of her relative decline in the world, and not of strength: "Stuck with outmoded physical plants and outmoded forms of business organization, [Britain] now felt the less favorable effects of being the first to modernize."

Timeline

 1833: Britain annexed the Falkland Islands.
 1838: Britain annexed the Pitcairn Islands.
 1839: Britain conquered Aden from the Sultanate of Lahej.
 1841: Britain established the Colony of New Zealand.
 1842: Britain received Hong Kong Island from China.
 1849: Britain annexed the Sikh Empire in Punjab.
 1853: France annexed New Caledonia.
 1855: Division of the Kuril Islands and Sakhalin between Russia and Japan.
 1857: Britain annexed the Cocos (Keeling) Islands and Perim. Completion of the French conquest of Algeria.
 1857: Britain suppressed the Indian Rebellion.
 1862: Creation of French Cochinchina. British Honduras declared a colony.
 1867: United States purchased Alaska from Russia.
 1869: Japan annexed Hokkaido.
 1870: Russia annexed Novaya Zemlya.
 1874: Britain established the Colony of Fiji.
 1875: Japan annexed the Bonin Islands.
 1879: Japan annexed the Ryukyu Islands.
 1881: France annexed Tunisia.
 1882: Britain occupied Egypt.
 1884: Argentina completed the Conquest of the Desert in Patagonia.
 1885: Britain completed the conquest of Myanmar. Belgian king established the Congo Free State. German protectorate over Marshall Islands.
 1887: British protectorate over Maldives. Creation of French Somaliland.
 1888: Britain annexed Christmas Island. Creation of British Somaliland. Germany annexed Nauru. Chile annexed Easter Island.
 1889: Creation of French Polynesia.
 1890: British protectorate over Zanzibar. Creation of Italian Eritrea.
 1892: Britain annexed Banaba Island and Gilbert Islands.
 1895: China ceded Taiwan and Penghu to Japan.
 1897: France annexed Madagascar.
 1898: United States annexed Hawaii.
 1898: United States annexed Puerto Rico, Cuba, Guam and the Philippines.
 1899: Division of the Samoan Islands into German Samoa and American Samoa.
 1900: British protectorate over Tonga.
 1906: Britain and France established the New Hebrides condominium.
 1908: France annexed the Comoro Islands.
 1910: Japan annexed the Korean Empire.
 1914: Britain annexed Cyprus.

See also 

 Dollar diplomacy, US about 1910
 Historiography of the British Empire
 Imperialism
 Crisis theory
 International relations (1814–1919)
 Timeline of European imperialism
 Imperialism in Asia

People
Otto von Bismarck, Germany
Joseph Chamberlain, Britain
Jules Ferry, France
Napoléon III, France
Victor Emmanuel III of Italy
William McKinley, United States
Emperor Meiji, Japan
Julio Argentino Roca, Argentina
Porfirio Díaz, Mexico

Notes

References

Further reading
 Albrecht-Carrié, René. A Diplomatic History of Europe Since the Congress of Vienna (1958), 736pp; basic survey
 Aldrich, Robert. Greater France: A History of French Overseas Expansion (1996) 
 Anderson, Frank Maloy, and Amos Shartle Hershey, eds. Handbook for the Diplomatic History of Europe, Asia, and Africa, 1870–1914 (1918), highly detailed summary prepared for use by the American delegation to the Paris peace conference of 1919. full text
 
 Baumgart, W. Imperialism: The Idea and Reality of British and French Colonial Expansion 1880-1914 (1982) 
 Betts, Raymond F. Europe Overseas: Phases of Imperialism (1968) 206pp; basic survey
 Cady, John Frank. The Roots of French Imperialism in Eastern Asia (1967) 
 Cain, Peter J., and Anthony G. Hopkins. "Gentlemanly capitalism and British expansion overseas II: new imperialism, 1850‐1945." The Economic History Review 40.1 (1987): 1–26.
 

 Hinsley, F.H., ed. The New Cambridge Modern History, vol. 11, Material Progress and World-Wide Problems 1870-1898 (1979)
 Hodge, Carl Cavanagh. Encyclopedia of the Age of Imperialism, 1800–1914 (2 vol., 2007); online
 Langer, William. An Encyclopedia of World History (5th ed. 1973); highly detailed outline of events; 1948 edition online
 Langer, William. The Diplomacy of Imperialism 1890-1902 (1950); advanced comprehensive history; online copy free to borrow also see online review
 Manning, Patrick. Francophone Sub-Saharan Africa, 1880–1995 (1998) online  
 Moon, Parker T. Imperialism & World Politics (1926), Comprehensive coverage; online
 Mowat, C. L., ed. The New Cambridge Modern History, Vol. 12: The Shifting Balance of World Forces, 1898–1945 (1968); online 
 Page, Melvin E. et al. eds. Colonialism: An International Social, Cultural, and Political Encyclopedia (2 vol 2003) 
 Pakenham, Thomas. The Scramble for Africa: White Man's Conquest of the Dark Continent from 1876-1912 (1992) 
 
 Stuchtey, Benedikt, ed. Colonialism and Imperialism, 1450–1950, European History Online, Mainz: Institute of European History, 2011
 
 Taylor, A.J.P. The Struggle for Mastery in Europe 1848–1918 (1954) 638pp; advanced history and analysis of major diplomacy; online

External links 
J.A. Hobson's Imperialism: A Study: A Centennial Retrospective by Professor Peter Cain
Extensive information on the British Empire
British Empire
The Empire Strikes Out: The "New Imperialism" and Its Fatal Flaws  by Ivan Eland, director of defense policy studies at the Cato Institute. (an article comparing contemporary defense policy with those of New Imperialism (1870–1914)
The Martian Chronicles: History Behind the Chronicles New Imperialism 1870–1914
1- Coyne, Christopher J. and Steve Davies. "Empire: Public Goods and Bads" (Jan 2007). Wayback Machine
Imperialism – Internet History Sourcebooks – Fordham University
The New Imperialism (a course syllabus)
The 19th Century: The New Imperialism
2- Coyne, Christopher J. and Steve Davies. "Empire: Public Goods and Bads" (Jan 2007). Wayback Machine

 
19th century
European colonisation in Africa